Raid on Rajallapor is an adventure  published under license by Grenadier Models in 1984 for Flying Buffalo's modern-day espionage role-playing game Mercenaries, Spies and Private Eyes (MSPE).

Plot summary
The player characters, a team of mercenaries, must first escort a Picasso painting to India, then steal a golden statue of Shiva. Pre-generated characters and maps are provided. The book also contains a solo adventure involving finding a microfilm hidden in a casino.

Publication history
In the early 1980s, Grenadier Models was a manufacturer of fantasy miniatures. In 1984, Grenadier decided to diversify by creating licensed RPG adventures. During the year, Grenadier published four adventures: Cloudland for Advanced Dungeons & Dragons; The Horrible Secret of Monhegan Island for Call of Cthulhu; Disappearance on Aramat for Traveller; and Raid on Rajallapor for MSPE, a 48-page book written by Gary Pilkington, with interior artwork by Flint Henry, and cover art by Martin Kealey.

Reception
In Issue 20 of Imagine, Nick Davison disagreed with the mystical element in Raid on Rajallapor, saying, "The scenario is well produced but I have my doubts about supernatural intervention, a device which also appears in [previously published MSPE adventure] Jade Jaguar. Perhaps the designers think this is an original way of shaking the players. But if it is repeated, surely it loses its impact?"

References

Mercenaries, Spies and Private Eyes
Role-playing game adventures
Role-playing game supplements introduced in 1984